Waycobah First Nation is composed of two Mi'kmaq Indigenous reserves on Cape Breton Island, Nova Scotia. As of 2012, the population is 833 on-Reserve, and about 82 off-Reserve. It is composed of two parts:

See also
List of Native Reserves in Nova Scotia
List of Native Reserves in Canada

External links
 Waycobah First Nation website

First Nations governments in Atlantic Canada
First Nations in Nova Scotia
Mi'kmaq governments
Communities in Inverness County, Nova Scotia